Kallon is a surname of Sierra Leone, most notable is the Kallon footballer family.
Mohamed Kallon, youngest of the three, played at Internazionale, Monaco
Kemokai Kallon, Sierra Leonean footballer, brother of Mohamed
Musa Kallon, Sierra Leonean footballer, brother of Mohamed
Kallon F.C., founded by Mohamed Kallon
Abdul Kallon, American lawyer
Morris Kallon, former Sierra Leonean rebel military commander
Varney Kallon (born 1975), Liberian footballer